Bodgy Tatts is an EP by the Australian folk punk band Mutiny. It was self-released in 1996 and was followed up by their debut album, Rum Rebellion, in 1997. The first two tracks are also featured on Rum Rebellion and the final track, "Banjo Tatts," is an instrumental version of "Bodgy Tatts." "Move Along" was originally written by Ewan MacColl.

Track listing
 "Bodgy Tatts" - 2:32
 "Here's to Adventure" - 0:53
 "Freaks in Town" - 3:23
 "Move Along" (Ewan MacColl) - 2:24
 "Banjo Tatts" - 2:27

Credits
 Alice - bass
 Chris - vocals, drums
 Michelle - violin, vocals
 Greg - guitar, vocals
 Briony - vocals, 12 string guitar, mandolin, tin whistle

With guests
Gus McMillan - banjo
David Corbet - trumpet

Mutiny (band) albums
1996 EPs